Pulchriphyllium is a genus of leaf insects. It was first established by Griffini in 1898 as a subgenus within the genus Phyllium and is a valid genus since 2021. The distinctive feature of Pulchriphyllium is the presence of lobes on the inside and outside of the fore tibia. In Phyllium are lobes only present on the outside. The representatives of the genus are native to both Sundaland and continental Asia.

Species 

 Pulchriphyllium abdulfatahi 
 Pulchriphyllium agathyrsus 
 Pulchriphyllium agnesagamaae 
 Pulchriphyllium bioculatum 
 Pulchriphyllium detlefgroesseri 
 Pulchriphyllium fredkugani 
 Pulchriphyllium giganteum 
 Pulchriphyllium lambirensis 
 Pulchriphyllium maethoraniae 
 Pulchriphyllium mannani 
 Pulchriphyllium pulchrifolium  - type species (as Phyllium pulchrifolium )
 Pulchriphyllium rimiae 
 Pulchriphyllium shurei 
 Pulchriphyllium sinense

References

Phasmatodea genera
Phasmatodea of Asia